PREfection is the second studio album by Cass McCombs, released in 2005. It is a follow-up to his 2003 debut album A.

Track listing
"Equinox" – 3:35
"Subtraction" – 3:49
"Multiple Suns" – 5:22
"Tourist Woman" – 3:47
"Sacred Heart" – 4:06
"She's Still Suffering" – 5:20
"Cuckoo" – 4:05
"Bury Mary" – 2:18
"City of Brotherly Love" – 4:29
"All Your Dreams May Come True" – 10:32

Personnel
Cass McCombs (Composer, Primary Artist)
Natalie Conn (Keyboards, Vocals)
Dutch Germ (Drums, Vocals)
Trevor Shimizu (Bass, Sampling, Vocals, Photography)
Bill Skibbe (Engineer)
Jessica Ruffins (Engineer)
Steve Rooke (Mastering)
Chris Coady (Mixing)
Asha Schecter (Layout Design)

References

External links

Cass McCombs (official site)

2005 albums
Cass McCombs albums
4AD albums